Tanapag is a nearly extinct Micronesian language of the Austronesian language family. It is spoken in the Tanapag settlement of the island of Saipan in the Northern Mariana Islands. Younger people speak Chamorro instead of Tanapag, but there are also efforts being made to promote the language.

See also
 Carolinian language

Further reading
  (Includes Tanapag versions of some words.)

References

Chuukic languages
Languages of the Northern Mariana Islands
Endangered Austronesian languages